Appudappudu is a 2003 Indian Telugu-language romantic drama film directed by Chandra Siddhartha starring Raja and Sriya Reddy, in her Telugu debut.

Plot 
Sundeep and Radhika get married. After realizing their differences, they break up. However, they later realize that they are made for each other and try to unite with each other again.

Cast 

Raja as Sundeep
Sriya Reddy as Radhika
Jayasudha as Radhika's mother
Kaikala Satyanarayana
Suman Setty as a servant
Krishna Bhagawan 
Vizag Prasad 
Sudha
Giribabu
Benarjee
Annapurna
Ali
M. S. Narayana
L. B. Sriram
Shankar Melkote

Soundtrack 
The songs were composed by R. P. Patnaik while Madhukar composed the score. The lyrices are written by Chaitanya Prasad and Peddada Murthy. In an audio review of the soundtrack, Sreya Sunil of Idlebrain.com wrote that "Over all, the album is a passable fare except for two songs (Nee Kalalu Kavali, Idigo Ippude), which are instant winners".
"Wahwa Wahwa" -  Natasha Gulmohar
"Nee Kalalu Kaavali" - R. P. Patnaik and Sunitha 
"Neekem Telusu" - Usha
"Idigo Ipude" - Usha, R. P. Patnaik
"Gudugudu Gunchem" - Usha, Lenina, Gayatri, R. P. Patnaik, Ravi Varma
"Nandalala Nandalala"- Usha, R. P. Patnaik

Release 
The film was initially scheduled to release on 1 April 2003.

Jeevi of Idlebrain.com gave this film a rating of two out of five and opined that "The first half of the film is boring. Second half of the film is slightly better. The best things about this film are songs and photography. This film suffers from bad editing and slow screenplay". A critic from Sify gave the film a verdict of "Missable" and said that "The emotional scenes are a let down due to the lack of story. The only saving grace of this insipid film is the music of R.P. Patnaik and the camera of Soman". Mithun Verma from Full Hyderabad criticised the film.

Although the film was a box office failure, Raja credits this film with giving him a wider reach.

References